Sesto San Giovanni, locally referred to as just Sesto, is a comune in the Metropolitan City of Milan, Lombardy, northern Italy. Its railway station is the northernmost stop on the Milan Metro M1 line. The comune has the honorary title of city, despite being a de facto suburb of Milan.

An unimportant agglomerate of buildings until the 19th century, Sesto San Giovanni grew during the end of the 19th century and in the early 20th century, becoming the site of several industries, including companies such as Falck, Campari, Magneti Marelli and Breda. In that period the population increased rapidly, from 5,000 inhabitants in 1880 to 14,000 in 1911. After World War II, Sesto became populated by many migrants from other parts of Italy, leading to an increased population of 95,000 inhabitants in 1981. Sesto used to be referred to as the "Stalingrad of Italy", due to the strong historical presence of the Italian Communist Party and to its resistance to fascism in World War Two.

Because of its diverse and growing industries, Sesto has drawn many immigrants. Census statistics from 2016 state that 17% of the population is composed of immigrants.

In the 1990s, Sesto San Giovanni suffered an economic crisis, and most of the larger companies in the town closed their premises. The town partially succeeded in converting its economy from steel production to service industries. Several large companies opened offices in Sesto, such as ABB Group, WIND Telecommunications, Impregilo and Oracle Corporation.

On 23 December 2016, Anis Amri, perpetrator of Berlin truck attack was shot fleeing in the city by the police.

Sesto San Giovanni received the honorary title of city by presidential decree on 10 April 1954.

People
 Ferdinando Terruzzi (1924–2014), railway cyclist
 Nicolás Cotugno (born 1938), former Roman Catholic Archbishop of Montevideo, Uruguay
 Teresa Sarti Strada (1948–2009), co-founder of Emergency
 Gino Strada (1948–2021) war surgeon and founder of Emergency, a UN-recognized international humanitarian organisation that gives free medical treatment to victims of war
 Massimo Carrera (born 1964), footballer and coach
 Marco Saligari (born 1965), cyclist
 Barbara Fusar-Poli (born 1972), figure skater
 Fabio Macellari (born 1974), footballer
 Franco Masetto (born 1942), footballer

Twin towns - sister cities
Sesto San Giovanni is twinned with:
 Saint-Denis, France
 Zlín, Czech Republic

References

Cities and towns in Lombardy